A water salute occurs for ceremonial purposes when a vehicle travels under plumes of water expelled by one or more fire fighting vehicles. 

At an airport, typically an even number of vehicles will line up perpendicularly on the sides of the taxiway or apron, and the plumes of water will form a series of arches. Symbolically, the procession looks similar to a bridal party walking under a wedding arch or the saber arch at a military wedding.

Water salutes have been used to mark the retirement of a senior pilot or air traffic controller, the first or last flight of an airline to an airport, the first or last flight of a type of aircraft, as a token of respect for the remains of soldiers killed in action, or other notable events. When the Concorde flew its last flight from John F. Kennedy International Airport, blue, white and red coloured plumes were used. 

Water salutes are also used for ships and other watercraft, with water being delivered by fireboats. This is often done for the first or last visit or retirement of a senior captain, the first or last cruise of a ship, the visit of a warship, or other ceremonial occasions.

See also
 Plume (hydrodynamics)
 Salute
 Water cannon

References

 

Firefighting
Greetings
Salutes
Fire service awards and honors